Baptized in Blood was a five-piece London, Ontario-based heavy metal band. They were managed by Dave Mustaine, the frontman of American thrash metal band Megadeth.

In 2006, they independently released the EP Baptized in Blood. In 2009, they independently released the album Gutterbound. That led to their being signed to Roadrunner Records, in December 2009. They stayed with Roadrunner for three years, releasing one album, also called Baptized in Blood. In 2021, Cursed Blessing Records re-released Gutterbound.

From 2009 through 2011, Baptized in Blood toured the US and Europe. They supported Fear Before on their final Canadian tour in August and September 2009. They played several European festivals, including  the 2011 Download Festival. Their last concert was at Heavy T.O. 2011.

Members

 Johl Fendley – lead vocals (2004–2012)
 Josh Torrance – lead guitars (2004–2012)
 Alex Johnston – drums (2007–2010, 2011-2012)
 Jason Longo – drums (2010–2010)
 Jay Westman – drums (2006–2007)
 Adam Trakinskas – lead vocals (2004–2007)
 Brad Nassar – bass, backing vocals (2004–2006)

Discography

References

External links
 

Canadian thrash metal musical groups
Canadian metalcore musical groups
Musical groups from London, Ontario
Musical groups established in 2004
2004 establishments in Ontario